Moksham is a 1997 Malayalam language film, directed by Beypore Mani. The movie received Kerala State Film Award for Best Children's Film award in 1997.

Cast
 Madhu
 Mamukoya
 V. K. Sreeraman
 Nithin
 Thodupuzha Vasanthi
 Thiruthiyadu Vilasini
 Dayana
 Simla
 Gracy
 Athira
 Suhas
 Sudhi

Soundtrack
The music was composed by Baiju Anchal.

References

1997 films
1990s Malayalam-language films